Ophiogramma is a genus of moths in the family Geometridae first described by Jacob Hübner in 1831.

Species
Ophiogramma coenobiata (Felder & Rogenhofer, 1875)
Ophiogramma injunctaria Hübner, [1831]

References

Desmobathrinae